The red dragonet (Foetorepus altivelis) is a species of dragonet native to the Indian Ocean and the western Pacific Ocean where it occurs at depths of from . Males of this species reaches a length of  SL while females only reach  SL.  This species is of commercial importance to local fisheries.

References

Fish of the Pacific Ocean
Fish of East Asia
Fish of Japan
Fish of China
Fish of Taiwan
Fish of Indonesia
Marine fish of Western Australia
red dragonet